Villafranca del Bierzo is a village and municipality located in the comarca of El Bierzo, in the province of León, Castile and León, Spain.

Villafranca del Bierzo lies 187 kilometers from Santiago de Compostela and is located between Ponferrada and O Cebreiro on the Way of St. James pilgrimage route to Santiago de Compostela.

History
The first human settlements in the area date to the Neolithic age, while the first historically known people living here were the Celtiberians, who lived in Bergidum, later known as Bergidum Flavium  after the Roman conquest.

In the Middle Ages, the town is first mentioned in 791. The origin of the modern town is connected to the Way of St. James, as a rest place for the pilgrims on their way to Santiago de Compostela beginning in the 9th century. In the Codex Calixtinus Villafranca is mentioned as an intermediate stage between Rabornal and Triacastela. In 1070, during the reign of Alfonso VI of León, a Cluniac monastery was founded here to cultivate wine, and a borough of French pilgrims rose around it, from which the town's name (meaning "French Town") stems. Numerous hotels and hospitals were established in the town for the pilgrims.

In the late 12th century Alfonso VII of León gave the lordship of Villafranca to his sister Sancha. Later it went to Urraca, wife of King Ferdinand II and then to Teresa, wife of Alfonso IX, and then to numerous other noble people. In 1486 the lordship became a marquisate assigned to Luis Pimentel y Pacego: his daughter married Pedro Álvarez de Toledo, whose family thenceforth held the marquisate for centuries. In 1619 saint Lawrence of Brindisi was brought here after his death in Lisbon and buried in the Monastery of the Assumtiion, which still contains his spoils.

During the Peninsular War Villafranca was the headquarters of the Galician army and was sacked three times by the English troops, and was later occupied by the French troops. The Spanish general Antonio Filangieri died here. The town was freed in 1810.

Main sights
Collegiate church of Santa María (16th-17th centuries)
Church of St. John (12th century)
Church of St. Nicholas (17th century)
Church of Santiago the Apostle (12th-13th centuries)
Monastery of the Annunciation: hosts the spoils of saint Lawrence of Brindisi
Monastery of St. Francis de Asís (13th century), of which only the late Romanesque church remains, with the upper façade and the two bell towers added in Baroque style during the 18th century.
Castle of the Counts of Pena Ramiro (16th century), with four towers
Palace of the Marquisses of Villafrance (18th century)
Palace of Torquemada (18th century)

Villages
The municipality comprises several villages:

Villafranca del Bierzo 
Vilela
Valtuille de Arriba
Valtuille de Abajo
Paradaseca
Puente de Rey
Cela
Ribón
Veguellina
Tejeira
Villar de Acero
Campo del Agua
Aira da Pedra
Pobladura de Somoza
Prado de Paradiñas
Prado de la Somoza

Local festivities 
 January 28, Santo Tirso
 February 3, San Blas
 May 1, Festa do Maio
 June, Poetry festivity
 July 25, Santiago
 August, Tourist festivities
 September 14, El Cristo

Marquesses of Villafranca del Bierzo
1st Luis Pimentel y Pacheco (1486-1497) 
2nd Pedro Álvarez de Toledo (1497-1539)
3rd Fadrique Álvarez de Toledo y Osorio ; no issue (1539-1569)
4th García Álvarez de Toledo, brother (1569-1577)
5th Pedro Álvarez de Toledo (1577-1627)
6th García Álvarez de Toledo; no Issue; brother of Fadrique Álvarez de Toledo y Mendoza (1627-1649)
7th Fadrique Álvarez de Toledo y Ponce de León; son of Mendoza (1649-1705)
8th José Fadrique Álvarez de Toledo Osorio y Córdoba y Cardona (1705-1728) 
9th Fadrique Vicente Álvarez de Toledo; married sister of 13th Duke of Medina Sidonia (1728-1753) 
10th Antonio Álvarez de Toledo y Pérez de Guzmán (1753-1773)
11th José Álvarez de Toledo, Duke of Alba (1773-1796)
12th Francisco de Borja Álvarez de Toledo Osorio (1796-1821)
13th Pedro de Alcántara Álvarez de Toledo y Palafox (1821-1867)
14th José Álvarez de Toledo y Silva (1867-1900)
15th Joaquín Álvarez de Toledo y Caro (1900-1915)
16th Joaquín Álvarez de Toledo y Caro (1915-1955)
17th Luisa Isabel Álvarez de Toledo y Maura (1957-2008)
18th Leoncio Alonso González de Gregorio y Álvarez de Toledo (since 2010)

Church of Saint Nicolas
The Church of Saint Nicolas (Iglesia de San Nicolas) was founded in 1638 and is currently run by the Paulist Fathers. The costs of the original construction were paid by Gabriel Robles, a native son who got rich mining silver in Peru.

References

External links 

 www.villafrancadelbierzo.org

Municipalities in El Bierzo
Populated places in the Province of León
Astures